Jaranilla is a Filipino surname. Notable people with the surname include:

Delfín Jaranilla (1883–1980), Filipino judge 
Zaijian Jaranilla (born 2001), Filipino actor 
Zymic Jaranilla (born 2005), Filipino actor, brother of Zaijian 

Tagalog-language surnames